Katma Tui is a comic book superhero, an extraterrestrial from the planet Korugar, and a member of the intergalactic police force known as the Green Lantern Corps. She is a Green Lantern successor of the supervillain Sinestro and predecessor of Sinestro's daughter Soranik Natu.

Publication history
Katma Tui first appeared in DC Comics' Green Lantern (vol. 2) #30 (July 1964), and was created by writer John Broome and artist Gil Kane.

Fictional character biography
Katma Tui hails from the planet Korugar, in the area of space designated Sector 1417 by the Guardians of the Universe, beings from the planet Oa who oversee and administer the Green Lantern Corps. Korugar is also the homeworld of the renegade former Green Lantern Sinestro, who uses his Green Lantern powers to enslave the planet, and rule over it as a tyrant, unbeknownst to his Guardian superiors. Tui eventually leads a rebellion against Sinestro, and even testifies against him before the Guardians. Sinestro is imprisoned in the antimatter universe, on the planet Qward. Green Lantern Tomar-Re nominates Tui as Sinestro's replacement as Green Lantern of Sector 1417, and Tui accepts. The people of Korugar, however, come to view the Green Lantern symbol as one of oppression and pain, and see Tui as a monster for joining them. Tui is now known among her people as "Katma Tui the Lost", as seen in Green Lantern Corps: Recharge #1 (November 2005).

In her first mission, which occurs during her probationary period as a Lantern, Tui and Korugaran scientist Imi Kann destroy a giant space amoeba creature that threatens Korugar. Tui and Kann foll in love, and she decides to leave the Corps. Hal Jordan, the Green Lantern of Earth, manages to persuade her not to.

Tui goes on to become an exemplary Green Lantern on a number of adventures, including a prison breakout on the Guardians’ prison planet, her struggle against the telepathic influence of the alien Ffa’rzz the Mocker and her kidnapping by a group of terrorists who mistake her for Hal Jordan's love Carol Ferris. She is involved in the war against Krona, Nekron, the Weaponers of Qward, and the Anti-Green Lantern Corps. She successfully recruits Rot Lop Fan who has no concept of 'color', being sightless. Tui helps defeat the extra-dimensional entity known as Maaldor, who had cut off the Lanterns from the Main Battery that powered them. She is involved with in the events of the series Crisis on Infinite Earths and many subsequent conflicts with Sinestro.

Marriage
When Hal Jordan resigns from the Corps for Carol Ferris, Tui is infuriated, given that Jordan persuaded her to give up Imi Kann for the Corps. When John Stewart initially turns down the offer of replacing Jordan as Green Lantern of Earth, Tui, projecting her anger towards Jordan upon Stewart, dismisses him as a coward, which provokes Stewart into changing his mind. Tui would eventually train Stewart and work closely with him on a number of missions. The two soon fall in love, and with the blessings of the Guardians they marry. During the first Green Lantern Corps story arc at the Citadel on Earth, Tui works with a large contingent of Lanterns who find themselves based in California. This grouping includes Kilowog, Ch'p and Arisia.

Death
Katma Tui is slain by the villain Star Sapphire. Katma, at the time unpowered, is sliced to death while in her kitchen. Star Sapphire did this simply to make a point to Hal Jordan.

During the Green Lantern: Mosaic series, John Stewart becomes involved with a new society, various alien citizens placed together on one planet by an ex-Guardian, who had gone insane from loneliness. His efforts elevate him to become the first mortal Guardian of the Universe, known as The Master Builder. As his reward for this new level of awareness, John is reunited with his late wife, Katma Tui. However, tragedy strikes once again and Hal Jordan, possessed by Parallax, destroys both the Guardians and the Central Power Battery, robbing John of his newfound powers and his resurrected wife.

The Blue Lantern Saint Walker uses his blue power ring to calm John Stewart's rage from Red Lantern. By reading his psyche, the ring is able to discern that creating an image of Katma Tui would best serve this purpose. After being surrounded in an illusion of flying with his late-wife for several moments, Stewart emerges with the belief that he would be able to see Katma again.

In the Blackest Night crossover, black power rings are sent throughout the universe reanimating the bodies of the deceased. Katma Tui's name is among the first to be called out by a black ring, and she is shown reanimated as a member of the Black Lantern Corps. Katma travels on the planet Xanshi to see John and tries to weaken John by claiming that he caused the planet's destruction. However, John, spurred on by Star Sapphire Fatality's words, says that he was not the cause of it all and successfully fights off the Black Lanterns. Black Lantern Katma is then destroyed by the combined efforts of John and Fatality. The two join their lights together to destroy the black ring, rendering Katma's corpse inert.

Subsequently, in DC Rebirth, when Hal Jordan is transported into the Emerald Space, where fallen Green Lantern officers go after being killed on duty, he meets Katma Tui. She asks about John Stewart, with Hal revealing that John still misses her.

Other versions
In the Batman: In Darkest Knight, she is part of the Lantern team sent to restrain the Green Lantern Batman.

In other media

 Katma Tui has a brief, non-speaking appearance in the Superman: The Animated Series episode "In Brightest Day...".
 Katma Tui appears in the Justice League episode "Hearts and Minds", voiced by Kim Mai Guest. This version trains new Lantern recruits, similar to Kilowog, and is portrayed as one of the more senior members of the Lanterns.
 Katma makes a non-speaking appearance in the Justice League Unlimited episode "The Return" with many other Green Lanterns who come to kill Amazo for seemingly destroying Oa. Like most of the Lanterns in this episode, she sports a design change, purely for aesthetic purposes, according to the DVD commentary.
 Another version of the character appears in the Duck Dodgers episode "The Green Loontern", voiced by Tara Strong. She is a leader among the Corps members, but comes under the dubious impression that she needs Dodgers' assistance to save the day.
 Katma Tui makes a cameo in the Batman: The Brave and the Bold episode "Day of the Dark Knight!".

References

External links
 Article on the Death of Katma Tui
 Justice League Animated Profile
 Katma Tui's Death
 The Unofficial Katma Tui Biography
 Katma Tui in Women in Refrigerators list

Comics characters introduced in 1964
DC Comics aliens
DC Comics female superheroes
Characters created by Gil Kane
Characters created by John Broome
DC Comics extraterrestrial superheroes
Green Lantern Corps officers
Fictional revolutionaries